The Army Board is the top single-service management committee of the British Army, and has always been staffed by senior politicians and soldiers. Until 1964 it was known as the Army Council.

Membership of the Board
The composition is as follows:
Civilian
 Secretary of State for Defence
 Minister of State for the Armed Forces
 Minister for Defence Equipment, Support and Technology
 Under Secretary of State for Defence and Minister for Veterans
 Permanent Under-Secretary of State for Defence
 Second Permanent Under-Secretary of State for Defence (Secretary of the Army Board)
British Army
 Chief of the General Staff
 Deputy Chief of the General Staff
 Assistant Chief of the General Staff
 Commander Home Command
 Commander Field Army
 Chief of Materiel (Land)
 Army Sergeant Major

The Executive Committee of the Army Board (ECAB) dictates the policy required for the Army to function efficiently and meet the aims required by the Defence Council and government. The Chief of the General Staff is the chairman of the Executive Committee of the Army Board.

In 2015, the newly created Army Sergeant Major became the first enlisted soldier to be a member of the Executive Committee of the Army Board.

Former members of the board
Included: 
 Chief Scientist (Army), (civil)
 Deputy Under Secretary of State (Army), (civil)
 Master-General of the Ordnance, (military)
 Permanent Under Secretary of State (Administration), (civil)
 Vice-Chief of the General Staff, (military)

See also
Air Force Board – for the RAF
Admiralty Board – for the Royal Navy

References

 

British Army
British defence policymaking